"Speak Softly (You're Talking to My Heart)" is a song written by Jesse Mendenhall and Steve Spurgin, and recorded by American country music artist Gene Watson.  It was released in February 1982 as the second single from album Old Loves Never Die.  The song reached #9 on the Billboard Hot Country Singles & Tracks chart.

Chart performance

References

1982 singles
1981 songs
Gene Watson songs
MCA Records singles